Yirol  is a city in South Sudan.

Location
It is located in Yirol West County, Lakes State, in central South Sudan. The coordinates of Yirol are: 6° 33' 36.00"N, 30° 30' 36.00"E (Latitude: 6.5600; Longitude: 30.5100).

Overview

Yirol is a small but growing town in the middle of South Sudan. It is surrounded by water bodies (a river and a lake) which offer water for human and livestock use and consumption. The fish from the river and lake are a  source  of badly needed protein for the local population.

Yirol is also the seat of an Anglican bishopric.

Population
, it estimated that the population of Yirol, South Sudan is approximately 11,650.

Economy
The three pillars of the economy in Yirol are (a) cattle ranching (b) fishing and (c) subsistence agriculture. Cattle ranching requires frequent movement of animals in search of green pastures, in concert with the rain patterns in the area. Fishing takes place on nearby Lake Yirol, Lake Nyiboor, Lake Anyii and River Payii.

Transport
Three roads lead out of town:
 The road west leads to the town of Rumbek (est.pop: 2011 = 32,100), the capital of western State.
 The road north eventually leads to the town of Bentiu (est.pop: 2011 = 7,700), the capital of Unity State
 The road south eventually leads to the city of Juba (est.pop: 2008 = 250,000), the capital of South Sudan and the largest city in the country.

The town of Yirol is also served by Yirol Airport.

Photos
Photo of Women in Yirol in 2009

External links
 Location of Yirol At Google Maps
YouTube video of Yirol fishermen
Thousands of South Sudanese Continue to Return From The Republic of Sudan

See also
 Yirol Airport
 Lakes (state)
 Bahr el Ghazal

References

Populated places in Lakes (state)
Bahr el Ghazal